Abd ol Aziz (also Romanized as ‘Abd ol ‘Azīz; also known as ‘Abd ol ‘Azīz-e Cheleh and ‘Abdollāh ‘Azīz-e Cheleh) is a village in Cheleh Rural District, in the Central District of Gilan-e Gharb County, Kermanshah Province, Iran. At the 2006 census, its population was 231, in 48 families.

References 

Populated places in Gilan-e Gharb County